Munro is a city of the Vicente López Partido in northern Greater Buenos Aires, Argentina, best known for its jeans and apparel stores and outlets. It is located some 20 km from the downtown of the city.

It is bordered by the neighborhoods of Villa Adelina, Carapachay and Martínez on the north; Villa Ballester on the west; Florida Este in the south; and Olivos to the east. The border streets are Mariano Moreno, Bartolomé Mitre Avenue, Paraná, National Highway 9 (Panamericana), Antonio Malaver, Alexander Fleming, Luis María Drago, Primera Junta, Montes de Oca, Capitán Cajaraville, Juramento, Carlos Calvo, Albarellos, and Belgrano.

There are many sports clubs in Munro such as Unión Vecinal de Fomento Munro (founded on 1922), Olivos Rugby Club (1927), Club Unión de Munro (1946), Club Social y Deportivo Industrial Munro (1947).

Some of Munro's local industries are: Atanor, Fabriloza, Colorín, Virulana, Ripán, Telagoma, Bayer, Gillette and other factories of clothing, lumber, steel, food, etc. In the town were located the Lumiton filming studios (they still exist today as a museum of the movies filmed there).

History 

Although a grocery store (known as "Pualpería del Fondo de la Legua" and owned by merchant Gregorio Rodríguez) had existed on the corner of Avenida Mitre and Vélez Sarsfield by 1850, the neighborhood of Munro was born with the construction of a station of the Córdoba Central rail line (now Ferrocarril General Belgrano) on April 30, 1912. The English railway company, associated to the Compañía Argentina de Tierras del Norte, acquired lands near the railway and charged its station chief, Alfredo Dionisio Godoy, the lands sale. The station has its name after Scottish immigrant Duncan Mackay Munro (1844–1929), who managed several railway companies in Argentina including Buenos Aires and Ensenada, Santa Fe, and Córdoba Central. Munro was also member of committees for road construction and agriculture, and founding member of the Scottish Church of Buenos Aires. Munro donated lands to build the train station and a park in the current "Munro" district. Besides, Munro's daughter, Adelina Munro Drysdale, would be later honored giving her name to the Villa Adelina district. Another neighbor town named after her, "Drysdale", was then changed to Carapachay.

On June 11, 1922, 49 neighbors led by Alfredo Dionisio Godoy founded the Unión Vecinal de Fomento de Munro. With the population growth, many stores were opened that formed an important commercial centre. Munro was also the site of Lumiton Studios, a movie production house founded by local radio pioneer Enrique Susini which, from 1931 to 1952, turned out over 180 full-length films and became among the best-known in Argentine cinema. On November 11, 1961, the partido's first school was founded: School Nº4 Domingo Faustino Sarmiento. On March 22, 1965, the Santa María Reina church is founded, and from 1996 it belongs to the San Isidro obispado.

Avenida Mitre consolidated as the main commercial center of the neighborhood after American jeans manufacturers Lee and Wranger opened their shops there in early 1970s. Levi's arrived in 1976. They commercialised second-choice clothing with good sells.

In 1981 Mitre Avenue was repaired, thus modernizing the commercial centre. In 1984, Governor of Buenos Aires Alejandro Armendáriz promulgated a decree that named the city "Capital de la Indumentaria" to promote selling clothing in the district. During the 1970s and 1980s the commercial centre was a great success and one of the main driver of the economy of Vicente López Partido. The boom of the textile industry brought a lot of people to Munro in search of jeans (the most popular of its products) but also t-shirts, and sweaters, which could be buy at affordable prices, even a 50% less than other stores. 

In 1995 the Centro Cultural Munro (Munro Cultural Center) was inaugurated with a capacity for 870 people.

Population 
The city area is approximately 5.8 km² and is populated by 35,844, being the third most populous city in the partido, with 13.1% of its total population. In 1991 there were 36,188 citizens, which implies a 1% drop compared to 2001.

Education

The area once had a German school, Deutsche Schule Munro.

Notable people 

Julio Bocca
Jorge Sotomayor (born 1988), Argentine footballer

Sports 

The most important activity is football, with several social clubs hosting the sport apart from other activities. Club Atlético Colegiales was established in 1908 as "Club Atlético Libertarios Unidos" in the city of Buenos Aires. The club affiliated to the Argentine Football Association and has played in the competitions organised by the body since then. Colegiales moved to their new location on Antonio Malaver and Gervasio Posadas streets (then Munro, currently Florida Oeste) in 1948, where the institution has been located since then.

Rugby union and field hockey are represented by the Olivos Rugby Club, established in 1927. The rugby teams compete in tournaments organised by the Unión de Rugby de Buenos Aires (URBA).

Gallery

References

External links

 Munro City website

Vicente López Partido
Populated places in Buenos Aires Province
Cities in Argentina
Argentina